1996 Cerezo Osaka season

Review and events

League results summary

League results by round

Competitions

Domestic results

J.League

Emperor's Cup

J.League Cup

Player statistics

 † player(s) joined the team after the opening of this season.

Transfers

In:

Out:

Transfers during the season

In
 Akinori Nishizawa (loan return from FC Volendam on May)
 Kazuo Shimizu (loan return from Gimnasia on July)
 Guga (on August)

Out

Awards

none

References

Other pages
 J.League official site
 Cerezo Osaka official site

Cerezo Osaka
Cerezo Osaka seasons